Canto del Agua Formation is a geological formation in the Atacama Region of northern Chile. Its stratigraphy from top to bottom is as follows: mudstone, limestone, sandstone, mudstone, conglomerate, lapilli tuff, conglomeradic sandstone, muddy sandstone. The environment where the sediments of the formation deposited is thought to have been the "submarine section of a coarse-grained fan delta" with other authors adding that the sedimentary basin where the sediments deposited was "bounded by two normal faults of WNW strike, active during deposition". The exact relationship with the underlying Llano de Chocolate Beds is not clear. In some locations the formation overlaps directly on the Punta de Choros Metamorphic Complex.

The type locality of the formation lies next to the Plomiza mine.

References 

Geologic formations of Chile
Triassic System of South America
Triassic Chile
Sandstone formations
Mudstone formations
Conglomerate formations
Limestone formations
Tuff formations
Paleontology in Chile
Geology of Atacama Region
Geology of the Chilean Coast Range